Lowell House was a publishing company based in Los Angeles, California headed by Jack Artenstein. It was purchased in the late 1990s by the Chicago Tribune.

External links
Tribune Education Acquires Publisher RGA/Lowell House

Publishing companies based in California
Companies based in Los Angeles